Star 106.3 (ACMA callsign: 4RGT) is a commercial Australian FM radio station based in Townsville, Queensland owned by ARN.

History
Star 106.3 was established as Mix FM in 1999 by RG Capital, headed by Reg Grundy. In 2003, the station was sold alongside sister station Sea FM (now Zinc 100.7) to Macquarie Regional RadioWorks. However, Macquarie was forced to sell two stations to ensure diversity in the market, and in 2005 Mix FM and Sea FM were sold to Prime Media Group. In 2007, Mix FM was rebranded as 106.3, later rebranded as 106.3FM in 2009.

In 2013, Prime Media Group sold its radio division to Grant Broadcasters. In May 2016, the station rebranded as Star 106.3, bringing it in line with sister stations in Mackay and Cairns.

In November 2021, Star 106.3, along with other stations owned by Grant Broadcasters, were acquired by the Australian Radio Network. This deal will allow Grant's stations, including Star 106.3, to access ARN's iHeartRadio platform in regional areas. The deal was finalized on January 4, 2022. It is expected Star 106.3 will integrate with ARN's KIIS Network, but will retain its current name according to the press release from ARN.

See also
Media in Townsville

External links
Star 1063 Website
https://www.facebook.com/star1063tsv

References 

Townsville
Radio stations in Queensland
Hot adult contemporary radio stations in Australia
Australian Radio Network